Celtic Park is a GAA stadium in Derry, Northern Ireland. With a capacity of about 18,000, the ground is the main home of Derry's hurling and Gaelic football teams.

Home football games are also sometimes held in Owenbeg, Dungiven. Hurling games on occasion take place at Lavey or Fr. McNally Park, Banagher.

As well as staging inter-county matches, it is often used for hosting Derry football and hurling games at club level. The Derry Senior Football Championship final has in recent years usually been held at the ground. The ground also hosts the Derry Intermediate Football Championship final plus the Derry Junior Football Championship final.

History
It was previously used for association football as the home of Derry Celtic F.C. in the Irish League from 1900–1913. Derry Celtic were the forerunner to Derry City, who had the opportunity to purchase the ground in 1933, but hesitated on a decision and the Derry County Board bought it ten years later.

The venue has been hosting Derry inter-county games since the 1930s. Over the years Dean McGilnchey Park in Ballinascreen hosted most Derry football games, but since the 1990s Celtic Park has established itself as the county's primary stadium.

Recent redevelopments

Floodlights were erected over the end of 2007 / start of 2008 and were first used for the National League game between Derry and Mayo on 2 February 2008. The official unveiling of the lights was held a few weeks later during the National League tie against Tyrone on 5 April.

In the last couple of years, despite being able to hold more, the capacity had been limited to 13,000 for safety reasons. However, this was not set to change with the venue currently undergoing a £1.8 million revamp. Work on a new all-seater stand on the Lone Moor Road side of the ground started a few days after the 2008 Derry Championship final. It was to hold 3,600 people, bringing the total stadium capacity to 18,000 or nearly 20,000. Other new developments in the revamped stand include a control room, TV gantry, media room, stewards' room, extra exit gates, improved disabled access and improved toilet facilities. The developments will make the stadium "among the best in Ulster".

The developments were not completed until the start of the Summer (2009), therefore Derry's home 2009 National League games had to be played elsewhere, most likely Glen or Ballinascreen. The renovations were completed in time for Derry's Ulster Senior Football Championship game with Monaghan (24 May).

See also
 List of Gaelic Athletic Association stadiums
 List of stadiums in Ireland by capacity

References

Buildings and structures in Derry (city)
Gaelic games grounds in Northern Ireland
Sport in Derry (city)
Sports venues in County Londonderry
Association football venues in Northern Ireland
Derry Celtic F.C.